John Cox (born 18 December 1959) is an Australian special effects artist who won at the 68th Academy Awards in the category of Best Visual Effects. He won for the film Babe, which he shared his win with Scott E. Anderson, Charles Gibson, and Neal Scanlan.

References

External links

Living people
Best Visual Effects Academy Award winners
Australian film people
Place of birth missing (living people)
1959 births
Special effects people